Mishkar (also Romanized as Mīshkar and Mīshgar) is a village in Dowreh Rural District, Chegeni District, Dowreh County, Lorestan Province, Iran. At the 2006 census, its population was 431, in 93 families.

References 

Towns and villages in Dowreh County